Mezoneuron hymenocarpum is a species of 'cat's claw' lianas, previously placed in the genus Caesalpinia, in the tribe Caesalpinieae.
Records are from: India, Indo-China, Malesia through to Australia, with no subspecies.

References

External links

Caesalpinieae
Flora of Indo-China
Flora of Malesia